In mathematics, in semigroup theory, a Rees factor semigroup (also called Rees quotient semigroup or just Rees factor), named after David Rees, is a certain semigroup constructed using a semigroup and an ideal of the semigroup.

Let S be a semigroup and I be an ideal of S. Using S and I one can construct a new semigroup by collapsing I into a single element while the elements of S outside of I retain their identity. The new semigroup obtained in this way is called the Rees factor semigroup of S modulo I  and is  denoted by S/I.

The concept of Rees factor semigroup was introduced by David Rees in 1940.

Formal definition
Let  be an ideal of a semigroup . The relation  in  defined by

 x ρ y  ⇔  either x = y or both x and y are in I

The quotient semigroup  is, by definition, the Rees factor semigroup of  modulo
. The Rees factor
semigroup has underlying set , where  is a new element and the product (here denoted by 
) is defined by

Example

Consider the semigroup S = { a, b, c, d, e } with the binary operation defined by the following Cayley table:

Let I = { a, d } which is a subset of S. Since

SI = { aa, ba, ca, da, ea, ad, bd, cd, dd, ed } = { a, d } ⊆ I 
IS = { aa, da, ab, db, ac, dc, ad, dd, ae, de } = { a, d } ⊆ I

the set I is an ideal of S. The Rees factor semigroup of S modulo I is the set S/I = { b, c, e, I } with the binary operation defined by the following Cayley table:

Ideal extension

A semigroup S is called an ideal extension of a semigroup A by a semigroup B if A is an ideal of S and the Rees factor semigroup S/A is isomorphic to B. 

Some of the cases that have been studied extensively include: ideal extensions of completely simple semigroups, of a group by a completely 0-simple semigroup, of a commutative semigroup with cancellation by a group with added zero. In general, the problem of describing all ideal extensions of a semigroup is still open.

References

 

Semigroup theory